Joe Hendricks (born June 19, 1979) is a Ghanaian football player who, currently plays for Kessben F.C.

Career
Hendricks began his career with Sekondi Wise Fighters before transferring to Asante Kotoko where he was named the captain after a few seasons. and joined after seven years in Kumasi to Ashanti Gold SC. After one year in Obuasi signed with Hapoel Ironi Rishon LeZion F.C. and turned on 10 April 2009 back to sign with Ghana Premier League club All Blacks FC.

References

External links
 

1979 births
Living people
Ghanaian footballers
Asante Kotoko S.C. players
Hapoel Rishon LeZion F.C. players
Expatriate footballers in Israel
Association football defenders
Ghana international footballers
Ashanti Gold SC players
All Blacks F.C. players
Footballers from Kumasi